Sar Margh-e Olya (also Romanized as Sar Margh-e ‘Olyā and Sar Morgh-e ‘Olyā; also known as Sar Margh and Sar Morgh) is a village in Robat Rural District, in the Central District of Khorramabad County, Lorestan Province, Iran. At the 2006 census, its population was 56, in 12 families.

References 

Towns and villages in Khorramabad County